Jane Wenham may refer to:

 Jane Wenham (alleged witch) (died 1730), subject of what is commonly but erroneously regarded as the last witch trial in England
 Jane Wenham (actress) (1927–2018), English actress